The All England Open Badminton Championships is the world's oldest badminton tournament, held annually in England. With the introduction of the BWF's latest grading system, it was given Super Series status in 2007, upgraded to Super Series Premier status in 2011.

The world's first open tournament was held in the English town of Guildford in 1898, the success of which paved the way for the All England's inaugural edition, which was held at London's Horticultural Halls in 1899. Although the inaugural edition consisted of just the doubles format, the singles were introduced from the second edition onward. It was eventually considered – especially after the first Thomas Cup series in 1949 – the unofficial world championship of the sport until 1977, when the International Badminton Federation launched its official championships.

There were two instances when it was halted – from 1915 to 1919 (due to World War I) and from 1940 to 1946 (due to World War II).

Historical venues for the Championships
The tournament has been held at eight venues, and is now played at Arena Birmingham, Birmingham.

Past winners

Multiple winners
Below is the list of the most successful players in the All England Open Badminton Championships:

In the modern era players are less able to compete in multiple disciplines due to the differentiation of required skills and the physical demands of the game. Some men's and women's doubles players are able to compete successfully in mixed doubles. The last player to win in both singles and a doubles discipline was Li Lingwei of China who won women's doubles in 1985 then in women's singles in 1989.

Many female badminton players change their surname after marriage. Below are some of the former names  or latest names as noted in the table above:
 – Judy Devlin later known as Judy Hashman 
 – Tonny Ahm formerly known as Tonny Olsen
 – Ethel Thomson later known as Larcombe
 – Margaret Tragett formerly known as Larminie
 – Gillian Gilks formerly known as Gillian Perrin and the latest was changed to Gillian Goodwin
 – Kirsten Thorndahl also known as Kirsten Granlund
 – Ulla Strand formerly known as Ulla Rasmussen
 – Kitty McKane later known as Godfree
 – Nora Perry formerly known as Nora Gardner
 – June Timperley formerly known as June White
 – Sue Devlin won her first three titles representing England then the next three representing Ireland
 – Susan Whetnall formerly known as Susan Pound
 – Etsuko Toganoo formerly known as Etsuko Takenaka
 – Iris Rogers formerly known as Iris Cooley
 – Margaret Stocks formerly known as Margaret McKane

Performances by nation

See also
 List of All England men's singles champions
 List of All England women's singles champions
 List of All England men's doubles champions
 List of All England women's doubles champions
 List of All England mixed doubles champions

References

External links
Official website

 
BWF World Tour
Badminton tournaments in England
Recurring sporting events established in 1899
1899 establishments in England